Remember Me  (often incorrectly called Gotta' Keep The Feeling In) is the Zutons' third single released from their 2004 debut album Who Killed...... The Zutons?.
The song peaked at number 39 in the UK in 2004.

Song meaning
The song's meaning is about the singer's relationship with a friend who is spending too much time with their girlfriend instead. He sings about how he wants him back and to leave her and become good friends again.

Track listing

CD version 1
 Remember Me
 Have I Lost You?
 Havana Gang Brawl (Demo)
 Remember Me (Video)

CD version 2
 Remember Me
 Long Time Coming (Live)

7" version
 Remember Me
 Zuton Fever (Live)

Other appearances
Acoustic 05 (2005, Echo)

Charts

References

The Zutons songs
2004 singles
2004 songs
Songs written by Dave McCabe